Stream of Thought (2009) is the first collaborative album by American ambient musician Steve Roach and Norwegian musician Erik Wøllo
. Described as "A continuous stream of sonic consciousness", with an uninterrupted flow of 19 interconnected pieces. The concept to the album’s structure was like film editing, with a sense of time and pacing consciously developed to activate a visceral experience. In 2011 The Road Eternal was released, their second collaboration album.

Reception 
AllMusic rated the album a 3.5 of 5, saying "ultimately this is an album for dedicated fans of either artist rather than newcomers".

Track listing

Personnel 
Adapted from Discogs
 Erik Wøllo – acoustic guitar, electric guitar, mandolin, bass guitar, synthesizer, loops, performer
 John Vega – cover
 Sam Rosenthal – graphic design
 Erik Wøllo – composer, mixing, producer, sequencer
 Steve Roach – composer, Mixing, producer, sequencer, mastering
 Steve Roach – synthesizer, performer, loops

References

External links 
 Stream of Thought at Bandcamp
 Stream of Thought at Discogs

2009 albums
Steve Roach (musician) albums
Projekt Records albums